This article presents a list of the historical events and publications of Australian literature during 1880.

Events 

 13 January — "The Bulletin" magazine publishes its first issue.  The magazine ceased publication on 29 January 2008.

Books 

 Rolf Boldrewood — The Miner's Right : A Tale of the Australian Goldfields
 Ada Cambridge — A Mere Chance
 R. Murray Prior — An Australian Heroine

Poetry 

 Ernest Favenc — "Bound to the Mast"
 Henry Kendall
 "Beyond Kerguelen"
 "Dedication: To a Mountain"
 "Leichhardt"
 "The Song of Ninian Melville"
 Songs from the Mountains
 James Brunton Stephens — Miscellaneous Poems

Drama 

 Marcus Clarke — The Happy Land

Births 

A list, ordered by date of birth (and, if the date is either unspecified or repeated, ordered alphabetically by surname) of births in 1880 of Australian literary figures, authors of written works or literature-related individuals follows, including year of death.

 3 September — Will Dyson, poet and artist (died 1938)
 30 November — Grant Madison Hervey, poet and author (died 1933)

Unknown date
 R. J. Cassidy, poet (died 1948)

Deaths 

A list, ordered by date of death (and, if the date is either unspecified or repeated, ordered alphabetically by surname) of deaths in 1880 of Australian literary figures, authors of written works or literature-related individuals follows, including year of birth.

See also 
 1880 in poetry
 List of years in literature
 List of years in Australian literature

References

Literature
Australian literature by year
19th-century Australian literature
1880 in literature